Dipterus (from  , 'two' and   'wing') is an extinct genus of lungfish from the middle Devonian period of Europe and North America.
 
Like its ancestor Dipnorhynchus, it had tooth-like plates on its palate instead of real teeth. However, unlike its modern relatives, in which the dorsal, caudal, and anal fin are fused into one, Dipterus's fins were still separated.

The genus was established by Adam Sedgwick & Roderick Murchison in the year 1828.

References

Prehistoric lungfish genera
Devonian bony fish
Devonian fish of Europe
Fossil taxa described in 1828